Anacrusis is a genus of moths belonging to the subfamily Tortricinae of the family Tortricidae.

Species
Anacrusis aerobatica (Meyrick, 1917)
Anacrusis atrosparsana Zeller, 1877
Anacrusis aulaeodes (Meyrick, 1926)
Anacrusis brunnorbis Razowski & Wojtusiak, 2008
Anacrusis epidicta Razowski & Becker, 2011
Anacrusis erioheir Razowski & Wojtusiak, 2006
Anacrusis gutta Razowski & Wojtusiak, 2009
Anacrusis guttula Razowski & Wojtusiak, 2010
Anacrusis marriana (Stoll, in Cramer, 1782)
Anacrusis napoensis Razowski & Pelz, 2007
Anacrusis nephrodes (Walsingham, 1914)
Anacrusis rhizosema (Meyrick, 1931)
Anacrusis rubida Razowski, 2004
Anacrusis ruptimacula (Dognin, 1904)
Anacrusis russomitrana Razowski & Becker, in Razowski, 2004
Anacrusis securiferana (Walker, 1866)
Anacrusis stapiana (Felder & Rogenhofer, 1875)
Anacrusis subruptimacula Razowski & Becker, 2011
Anacrusis thunberghiana (Stoll, 1782)
Anacrusis turrialbae Razowski & Becker, 2011
Anacrusis yanayacana Razowski & Wojtusiak, 2010

See also
List of Tortricidae genera

References

 , 2005: World catalogue of insects volume 5 Tortricidae.
 , 2004: Atteriini collected in Brazil, with descriptions of four new species (Lepidoptera: Tortricidae). Shilap Revista de Lepidopterologica 32(128): 347-353.
 , 2004: Tortricinae and Chlidanotinae (Lepidoptera: Tortricidae) collected by B. Landry in Ecuador. Acta Zoologica Cracoviensia 47 (3-4): 249-261. Full article: .
 , 2011: Systematic and faunistic data on Neotropical Tortricidae: Phricanthini, Tortricini, Atteriini, Polyorthini, Chlidanotini (Lepidoptera: Tortricidae). Shilap Revista de Lepidopterologia 39 (154): 161-181.
 , 2006: Tortricidae (Lepidoptera) in the valley of Río Gualaceo, East Cordillera in Ecuador, with descriptions of new taxa. Acta Zoologica Cracoviensia 49B (1-2): 17-53. Full article: .
 , 2008: Tortricidae from the Mountains of Ecuador. Part III: Western Cordillera (Insecta: Lepidoptera). Genus 19 (3): 497-575. .
 , 2009: Tortricidae (Lepidoptera) from the mountains of Ecuador and remarks on their geographical distribution. Part IV. Eastern Cordillera. Acta Zoologica Cracoviensia 51B (1-2): 119-187. doi:10.3409/azc.52b_1-2.119-187. Full article: .
 , 2010: Some Tortricidae from the East Cordillera in Ecuador reared from larvae in Yanayacu Biological Station in Ecuador (Insecta: Lepidoptera). Genus 21 (4): 585-603. Full article: .
 , 1877, Horae Soc. ent. Ross. 13: 87.

External links
tortricidae.com

Atteriini
Tortricidae genera